Tenorio is a surname. Notable people with the surname include:

Politicians
 Froilan Tenorio (1939–2020), Northern Mariana Islander politician
 Joshua Tenorio, Guamanian politician
 Mercedes Tenorio (born 1956), Nicaraguan politician
 Nicolas Tenorio Cerero (1863–1930), Spanish historian
 Pedro Tenorio (1934–2018), Northern Mariana Islander politician

Sports
Ángela Tenorio (born 1996), Ecuadorian athlete
 Carlos Tenorio (born 1979), Ecuadorian football player
 Edwin Tenorio (born 1976), Ecuadorian football player
 LA Tenorio (born 1984), Filipino basketball player
 Máximo Tenorio (born 1968), Ecuadorian football player
 Otilino Tenorio (1980–2005), Ecuadorian football player
 Rosa Tenorio (born 1984), Ecuadorian weightlifter

Other
 Bruna Tenório (born 1989), Brazilian model
JoAnn M. Tenorio (1943-2019), American entomologist